is a Japanese manga artist. His best-known works include Moldiver and Hyper Doll. He recently began a new series, Taishō Baseball Girls, based on the light novels by Atsushi Kagurazaka.

Itoh's works are characterized by fight teams, idol stars, military action, and science fiction laced with inside jokes based on otaku culture. He also tends to include a lot of explosions, handgun fights, and gritty action scenes.

Works
Apple Cinderella (1987, 1 volume), Shogakukan
Ayame ni Oteage! (1987–1988), Shogakukan
Tokyo Bakuhatsu Musume (1992, 1 volume), Fujimi Shobo
Moldiver (1993–1994, 3 volumes), Tokuma Shoten
Rakushō! Hyper Doll (1995–1997, 5 volumes), Tokuma Shoten
Nemesis no Tsurugi (1996, 1 volume), Hakusensha
Angel Attack (1998, 2 volumes), Hakusensha
Angel Heart (1998, 1 volume), Hakusensha
Haruka Refrain (1998, 1 volume), Hakusensha
Tokyo Bakuhatsu Musume (1998, 2 volumes), Kadokawa Shoten
Shōjo Tantei (1999, 1 volume), Tokuma Shoten
Suteki na Lovely Boy (2001, 1 volume), Shonengahosha
Mazinger Anthology (2002, 1 volume), Futabasha
Angel Heart: Shinseiki Sailor-fuku Densetsu (2002, 1 volume), Noir Shuppan
Eien no Grace (2002, 1 volume), Shonengahosha
Cutie Honey aGoGo! (2005–2007, 2 volumes), Kadokawa Shoten/Tokuma Shoten, based on the works by Go Nagai
Nihon Furusato Chibatsu (2006, 1 volume), Tokuma Shoten
Ko wa Kasugai Amanatto (2008, 1 volume), Tokuma Shoten
Taishō Baseball Girls (2008-current), Tokuma Shoten, based on the light novels by Atsushi Kagurazaka

Sources:

References

External links
 Official site　

1960 births
Living people
Manga artists from Saitama Prefecture